Jean II de Brosse, also Jehan II de Brosse (1432 – 6 August 1482), was the elder son of Marshal of France Jean I de Brosse. He would become chamberlain of the king of France in 1449. He married Nicole, Countess of Penthièvre, daughter of Charles, Seigneur d'Avaugour and Isabeau de Vivonne. Nicole later brought him, through inheritance in 1479, the County of Penthièvre in the Duchy of Brittany.

Jean is known to have rebuilt the donjon in Fouras in 1480–1490.

Marriage and children 
Jean and Nicole had following children :
 Jean III de Brosse (died 1502), his successor.
 Pauline de Brosse, married John II, Count of Nevers
 Claudine de Brosse (1450–1513), married Philip II, Duke of Savoy
 Bernarde of Brosse, married William VIII, Marquess of Montferrat, no issue
 Helena of Brosse, married Boniface III, Marquess of Montferrat, brother of William VIII.

References

Sources

People of the Hundred Years' War
Counts of Penthièvre